Air Vice Marshal Maxwell Mantsebi-Tei Nagai is a Ghanaian air force officer and serves in the Ghana Air Force. He is a former Chief of Air Staff of the Ghana Air Force.

References

Chiefs of Air Staff (Ghana)
Ghanaian military personnel
Ghana Air Force personnel
Living people
Year of birth missing (living people)